Kustagi Lok Sabha constituency is a former Lok Sabha constituency in Hyderabad State, India.  This seat came into existence in 1951. With the implementation of States Reorganisation Act, 1956, it ceased to exist.

Assembly segments
Kustagi Lok Sabha constituency comprised the following seven Legislative Assembly segments:
Lingsugur
Manvi
Sindhanur
Gangavati
Koppal
Yelburga
Kushtagi

After Raichur district of erstwhile Hyderabad State got merged with Mysore State in 1956, this seat ceased to exist and was replaced by Koppal Lok Sabha constituency.

Members of Parliament 
1952: Shiv Murthy Swamy, Independent

Notes

See also
 Koppal Lok Sabha constituency
 Koppal district
 Raichur district
 List of former constituencies of the Lok Sabha

Koppal district
Raichur district
Former constituencies of the Lok Sabha
1956 disestablishments in India
Constituencies disestablished in 1956
Politics of Hyderabad, India
Former Lok Sabha constituencies of Karnataka